The Physical Education Association of the United Kingdom (PEAUK) is a  former leading body in the United Kingdom for physical education.  It was founded in 1899 as the Ling Association.

In 2006 PEAUK joined with The British Association of Advisers and Lecturers in Physical Education (BAALPE) to become the Association for Physical Education (AfPE), becoming the UK's only Physical Education subject association.

References

External links
Official website
 Association for Physical Education Association for Physical Education afPE Official website

1899 establishments in the United Kingdom
2006 disestablishments in the United Kingdom
Educational organisations based in the United Kingdom
Organisations based in Reading, Berkshire
Organizations established in 1899
Organizations disestablished in 2006
United K
Physical education in the United Kingdom
Sport in Reading, Berkshire